Middleton Township may refer to:

 Middleton Township, Lafayette County, Missouri
 Middleton Township, Columbiana County, Ohio
 Middleton Township, Wood County, Ohio
 North Middleton Township, Pennsylvania
 South Middleton Township, Pennsylvania
 Middleton Township, Turner County, South Dakota, in Turner County, South Dakota

Township name disambiguation pages